Major-General Sir Henry Frederick Cooke ('Kangkook') CB, KCH (bapt. 13 April 1783 – 10 March 1837), was a British soldier and Tory politician.

He was the son of George John Cooke of Harefield, MP for Middlesex, and Penelope Bowyer, daughter of Sir William Bowyer, 3rd Baronet of Denham Court. His father, the son of George Cooke, descended from a line of prothonotaries of the Court of Common Pleas. He was the younger brother of Lieutenant-General Sir George Cooke, and of Edward Cooke R.N.; his sister Penelope Anne was married to Robert Brudenell, 6th Earl of Cardigan.

Cooke served as a Staff Officer during the Peninsular War between 1809 and 1812, being promoted from Captain to Lieut-Colonel in the Coldstream Guards. He acted as Assistant Adjutant General to Sir Charles Stewart. After being aide-de-camp to the Duke of York from 1814 until 1827, he became his private secretary.

Cooke represented Orford in Parliament between 1826 and 1832 and was described as the ugliest man in the British army. His residence was at 50 Charles Street, Berkeley Square and he was married to Katherine Windham, daughter of Admiral Windham of Felbrigg.

References

External links
historyofparliamentonline.org, Cooke, Sir Henry Frederick (1783–1837), of 50 Charles Street, Berkeley Square and Harefield Park, Mdx..

British Army personnel of the Peninsular War
1783 births
1837 deaths
British Army major generals
Coldstream Guards officers
Members of the Parliament of the United Kingdom for English constituencies
Tory MPs (pre-1834)
Companions of the Order of the Bath
UK MPs 1826–1830
UK MPs 1830–1831
UK MPs 1831–1832
Recipients of the Order of St. George of the Third Degree
Recipients of the Pour le Mérite (military class)